Tom Holland (born June 15, 1936) is an American visual artist. Holland is known for creating a style of art that may use fiberglass (or fibreglass), aluminum (or aluminium), epoxy paint, plywood, beads, oil paint,  palette knives, marble, copper, paper, and clay. For clay he uses watercolor, acrylic urethane, and ceramic glazes.

Background and education
Holland began his formal art education at the University of California at Berkeley, where he was influenced by David Park before traveling to Chile as a Fulbright Grant recipient. Holland's early academic art influence was David Park at Berkeley, but his artistic style continued to develop through his travels and personal experiences.

Career

Contemporary practice
His beginning as a painter was labeled "funky". It wasn't until Holland began to work with aluminum that he achieved critical acclaim. His work has been described as taking inspiration from Cubism, Futurism, and Constructivism, and he has been called one of California's most important contemporary artists and was featured in Art in the San Francisco Bay Area, 1945–1980: An Illustrated History.

Holland works primarily with fiberglass and aluminum to create free-standing and wall installations, a style that has been said to encompass Abstract Expressionism (8). He creates his art by riveting metal to the fiberglass or aluminum, then using epoxy paint to add other elements to the piece which add depth, light, and color. His work has been labeled exhilarating and visually challenging, playing games and distorting the three-dimensional space.  Holland is represented by Bivins Gallery in Dallas, Texas.

Solo exhibitions
 1966 : Nicholas Wilder Gallery, Los Angeles 
 1970 : Neuendorf Gallery, Hamburg
 1972 : Felicity Samuel Gallery, London
 1972 : San Francisco Museum of Modern Art, San Francisco
 1980 : James Corcoran Gallery – Santa Monica
 1982 : Corcoran Gallery
 1983 : Bank of America Galleries, Santa Monica
 1989 : Persons and Lindell Gallery, Helsinki
 1994 : San Jose Museum of Art, San Jose
 1995 : Triton Museum, Silicon Valley
 2002 : John Berggruen Gallery, San Francisco
 2017 : Bivins Gallery

Collections

 Anderson Collection
 Berkeley Art Museum
 Brooklyn Museum
 Charles Schwab Company
 Chicago Art Institute
 Cleveland Center for Contemporary Art
 Denver Art Museum
 Di Rosa Collections
 Duker Collection
 Federal Reserve Bank, San Francisco
 Los Angeles County Museum*  Mayfield Fund
 Museum of Modern Art, New York
The National Gallery of Art
 Oakland Museum of California
 The Official Residence of the United States Ambassador to Switzerland
 Palm Springs Desert Museum
 San Francisco Art Institute
 San Francisco Museum of Modern Art
 The Santa Barbara Museum of Art Collection
 Seattle Art Museum
 Solomon R. Guggenheim Museum
 Walker Art Center, Minneapolis
 Whitney Museum of American Art

References

External links
 

1936 births
Living people
Artists from Washington (state)
University of California, Berkeley alumni
American abstract artists